Brian George Littleproud (born 25 June 1941) is a former Australian politician. He was a National Party member of the Legislative Assembly of Queensland from 1983 to 2001, representing Condamine until 1992 and Western Downs thereafter.

Littleproud was born in Chinchilla, Queensland, and was a teacher and farmer before becoming involved in politics. Elected during the Bjelke-Petersen National Party government, he was a backbencher until December 1987, when he became Minister for Education, Youth and Sport. Following Labor's win at the 1989 state election, he remained on the National Party's front bench and was Deputy Leader from 1991 to 1992. Following the Coalition's return to government in 1996, he became Minister for Environment, serving until 1998 when Labor returned to office. Littleproud retired in 2001.

References

1941 births
Living people
National Party of Australia members of the Parliament of Queensland
Members of the Queensland Legislative Assembly
21st-century Australian politicians